

Hans von Obstfelder (6 September 1886 – 20 December 1976) was a German general (General of the Infantry)  in the Wehrmacht during World War II. He was a recipient of the Knight's Cross of the Iron Cross with Oak Leaves and Swords.

In September 1941, during Operation Babarossa, the Nazi invasion of the Soviet Union, Obstfelder commanded the 29th Army Corps, which was among the first units of the Wehrmacht to reach Kyiv.  In October 2021, against the background of official commemorations marking the 80th anniversary of the Babi Yar Massacre, Obstfelder's name appeared among the 161 names of the perpetrators of that crime, released by the Babi Year Holocaust Memorial Center. Obstfelder was never tried for his involvement in the Babi Yar massacre.

Awards
 Iron Cross (1914) 2nd Class (September 1914) & 1st Class (June 1915)
 Clasp to the Iron Cross (1939)  2nd Class (20 September 1939) & 1st Class (29 September 1939)
 German Cross in Gold on 21 April 1943 as General der Infantry and commanding general of the XXIX. Armeekorps 
 Knight's Cross of the Iron Cross with Oak Leaves and Swords
 Knight's Cross on 27 July 1941 as General der Infanterie and commanding general of the XXIX. Armeekorps
 251st Oak Leaves on 7 June 1943 as General der Infanterie and commanding general of the XXIX. Armeekorps
 110th Swords on 5 November 1944 as General der Infanterie and commanding general of the LXXXVI. Armeekorps

References

Citations

Bibliography

 
 
 

1886 births
1976 deaths
Babi Yar
Holocaust perpetrators in Ukraine
People from Steinbach-Hallenberg
People from Hesse-Nassau
German Army generals of World War II
Generals of Infantry (Wehrmacht)
Recipients of the Gold German Cross
Recipients of the Knight's Cross of the Iron Cross with Oak Leaves and Swords
German prisoners of war in World War II held by the United States
Reichswehr personnel
Military personnel from Thuringia
German Army personnel of World War I